The 1985–86 Liga Alef season saw Hapoel Beit She'an (champions of the North Division) and Hapoel Dimona (champions of the South Division) win the title and promotion to Liga Artzit. Beitar Nahariya also promoted after promotion play-offs.

North Division

South Division

Tzafririm Holon merged with Liga Artzit club, Hapoel Holon. thus, leaving the league with 13 clubs.

Promotion play-offs

Beitar Nahariya promoted to Liga Artzit.

References
North division Maariv, 27.4.86, Historical Jewish Press 
South division Maariv, 27.4.86, Historical Jewish Press 
High mark for the first play-off Maariv, 4.5.86, Historical Jewish Press 
Beitar balance in Artzit kept Maariv, 11.5.86, Historical Jewish Press 

Liga Alef seasons
Israel
3